Green Bay High School is a co-educational secondary school in the West Auckland suburb of Green Bay, New Zealand, catering for students from Year 9 to Year 13. The school primarily serves the communities of Green Bay and Titirangi.

History

The school opened in 1973. The founding principal of the school, Des Mann, challenged many of the standard educational practices of the 1970s. He refused to allow students to be caned, did not enforce a school uniform, and did not stream pupils into academic and non-academic classes.

The school has since adopted a uniform, and began awarding prizes. In 1978, Green Bay High School opened Kākāriki Marae, the first marae built on high school grounds, after lobbying by Pat Heremaia, the head of Māori Language studies at Green Bay. Heremaia presented a paper in 1984 to the Māori Educational Development Conference, discussing the success of Kākāriki Marae, which was one of the factors which led to marae becoming common in New Zealand schools.

Notable staff
Carla Van Zon, artistic director and former physical education teacher

Notable alumni
Carl Evans, sailor
Laura O'Connell Rapira, activist
Fabian Soutar, rugby league player

References

Biography

1972 establishments in New Zealand
Educational institutions established in 1972
Secondary schools in Auckland
Whau Local Board Area
Schools in West Auckland, New Zealand